Paramoron diadematum is a species of beetle in the family Cerambycidae. It was described by Heller in 1910, originally under the genus Menyllodes.

References

Pteropliini
Beetles described in 1910